Downfall was a ska and punk band from the Bay Area formed by Tim Armstrong, Matt Freeman, Dave Mello, Pat Mello, and Jason Hammon following the break-up of Operation Ivy in 1989 and pre-dating Armstrong's and Freeman's wider recognition in Rancid. They performed three shows, one at 924 Gilman Street, over a period of three months.

Line-up
Tim Armstrong – vocals
Matt Freeman – bass
Dave Mello – drums
Pat Mello – guitar
Jason Hammon – guitar

Recordings
In 1989 Downfall recorded what was going to be a 10" on Very Small Records, but after a dispute over the amount of songs that should be included, the release was scrapped. In 1994 a number of those songs were going to compiled for a release on Lookout! Records and titled "Get Ready For Action." The album would have been Lookout!#99, and was scheduled for release in late 1994. Get Ready For Action was delayed and never released. Brett Gurewitz remixed the album, but due to Rancid's mainstream attention, it was also never released.

Compilation Appearances

External links

altpress feature
Blank Generation video

References

Musical groups from California